Cuesta College is a public community college in San Luis Obispo County, California.

History 
The first community college in the San Luis Obispo area was founded in 1916 as a San Luis Obispo High School division. It lasted until 1919 with the United States involved in World War I. Cal Poly had a junior college division from 1927 to 1932. Miramonte College of Atascadero filled the void as a private institution from 1933 to 1936. The county's second public junior college was formed in 1936 as a part of San Luis Obispo High School District but ceased operation in June 1959. 

On April 16, 1963, voters in SLO County agreed to form a community college district, forming the San Luis Obispo County Junior College District. In 1964, a limited evening division began at Camp San Luis Obispo, a California National Guard facility located between San Luis Obispo and Morro Bay.  

On October 4, 1965, the college was officially named Cuesta College. Five years later, following the approval of a $5 million bond, Cuesta broke ground on its current campus west of Camp San Luis Obispo to establish a 127-acre site including frontage property deeded to the college by the National Guard.

Campus 
Limited course offerings are also available at two other sites within the county operated by Cuesta College, one at Arroyo Grande High School in Arroyo Grande and the other at Nipomo High School in Nipomo.

The campus features a science forum including an observatory for astronomy courses, now named Bowen Celestial Observatory. With a 14-inch telescope including a special narrow wavelength-band filter, the observatory has been used since the 1970s, occasionally open to the public for viewing of events such as visible comets and solar eclipses.

In 2018, the college's San Luis Obispo campus received a $1.5 million gift from the Harold J. Miossi Charitable Trust; the donation toward Cuesta's Cultural and Performing Arts Center was the second-largest in the institution's then-55-year history. The center, featuring a 450-seat main theater as well as a 100-seat experimental theater, plus teaching facilities, was thereafter renamed as the Harold J. Miossi Cultural and Performing Arts Center.

Organization and administration 
Cuesta College is the only college in the San Luis Obispo County Community College District (or SLOCCCD, part of the California Community College system) and is accredited by the Accrediting Commission for Community and Junior Colleges. The district is governed by an elected five-member board of trustees.

Jill Stearns, the current president, began her presidency in July 2018 after Gilbert H. Stork retired. The gymnasium was renamed Gilbert H. Stork Gymnasium in his honor in August 2018.

Academics 
The college offers 76 Associate's degree programs and 96 certificate programs.  A number of Cuesta students transfer to the public California State University and University of California systems, including the nearby Cal Poly SLO campus, as well as private colleges and universities.

In 2012, Cuesta College's regional accreditor Western Association of Schools and Colleges placed the college on "show cause" status, warning the college that its accreditation might not be renewed. 
A year later, the college's accreditation was renewed and its status upgraded to "on warning."  The Tribune, the local newspaper of San Luis Obispo, described this as the result of a "years-long struggle to fix several deficiencies identified by the commission [that] came at a cost: lower enrollment, difficulty recruiting applicants and damaged morale." In February 2014, Cuesta's "on warning" status was removed and the accreditor certified that the college meets all of its standards.

Athletics 
The college's athletic teams are known as the Cougars and the school colors are green and white. The college currently fields seven men's and nine women's varsity teams. It competes as a member of the California Community College Athletic Association (CCCAA) in the Western State Conference (WSC) for all sports except wrestling, which competes in the Southern California Wrestling Association (SCWA).

Men's basketball 
In the history of the Western State Conference, Cuesta accumulated 10 WSC North Division championships from 1981 through 2016, the second-most in the league; only Ventura College (with 13 such titles) won more in that time span. In 2019, Cougars head coach Rusty Blair won his 500th career victory with the college, becoming the 13th coach in state history to total at least a half-thousand wins.

The 1996-97 academic year saw Cuesta set a program record for wins in a season (32), soon due to a CCCAA revision increased to 33 wins for an overall record of 33-5. The season included a February 12 victory over then-defending state champion Ventura, 98-87, with roughly 1,300 fans in attendance. On the Central Coast, at any level of college basketball, the 33-win total is tied as the second-most victories in a year, trailing only the 34-1 season of Allan Hancock College exactly four decades earlier in 1956-57.

Women's basketball 
During the 1981-82 season, Cuesta set a program record for winning percentage, going 19-1 overall (.950). The Cougars won the state's 1982 then-Division II championship in San Mateo, defeating Shasta College 68-59. LeAnne Armstrong scored 21 points in the title game and was named Tournament MVP.

Women's volleyball 
Cuesta won CCCAA state titles in 1979, 1985, and 1986.

Wrestling 
The Cougars, coached by Gary Meissner, won the 1980 California Community College (then-Division II classification) state championship on February 9, 1980 at Chabot College. Cuesta scored 29 team points for the trophy.

Notable people 

Dave Anthony, comedian
 Jay Asher, writer
 Josimar Ayarza, professional basketball player
 Doug Bernier, professional baseball player
 Sam Blakeslee (born 1955), founding director of the Institute for Advanced Technology & Public Policy at Cal Poly, San Luis Obispo
 Sean Chambers, professional basketball player
 Mangkubumi (born 1972), Crown Princess of the Yogyakarta Sultanate
Ian McCall, retired mixed martial artist
 Mike Miller, professional baseball player
 Jon Moscot (born 1991), professional baseball player
 Kristof Ongenaet, professional basketball player
 Logan Schafer, professional baseball player
 Jake Shields, mixed martial artist
 Robert Van Scoyoc, professional baseball coach
 Paula Zima, artist known for her sculptures, paintings and etchings

References

External links 
 

 
California Community Colleges
Educational institutions established in 1963
Schools accredited by the Western Association of Schools and Colleges
Universities and colleges in San Luis Obispo County, California
1963 establishments in California